Juma Athumani Kapuya (born 22 June 1945) is a Tanzanian CCM politician and Member of Parliament for Urambo West constituency since 1995.

Career
Kapuya was a member of the National Executive Council of the governing Chama Cha Mapinduzi (CCM) from 1997 to 2005. After serving as Minister of Labour, Youth Development and Sports, Kapuya was appointed as Minister of Defense and National Service on January 4, 2006. After two years as Defence Minister, he was appointed as Minister of Labour, Employment and Youth Development on February 12, 2008.

He is a CCM Member of Parliament in the Tanzanian National Assembly, representing the Urambo West constituency. Prior to his government service, Kapuya was a professor of botany at the University of Dar es Salaam.

References

1945 births
Living people
Tanzanian Muslims
Chama Cha Mapinduzi MPs
Tanzanian MPs 2010–2015
Tabora Boys Secondary School alumni
University of Dar es Salaam alumni
Alumni of Aberystwyth University
Academic staff of the University of Dar es Salaam